Battles in Time was a PC video game and was the only product co-developed by Quantum Quality Productions and American Laser Games. The game was a time travel-based strategy game.

In the far future, humans no longer needed war. When aliens decide to invade the planet, a test is made up to provide commanders for the army. Four time periods are used: 2025, World War II, the Roman Empire, and prehistoric times. Succeeding in these four missions will allow the human to take on the alien threat.

Reception

The game received a largely negative review from Computer Game Review.

References

External links 
 

1995 video games
American Laser Games games
Quantum Quality Productions games
Single-player video games
Strategy video games
Video games about time travel
Video games developed in the United States
Windows games